Uriel Flores Aguayo (born 6 May 1959) is a Mexican politician affiliated with the PRD. He served as a federal deputy of the LXII Legislature of the Mexican Congress representing Veracruz, and previously served in the LVII and LX Legislatures of the Congress of Veracruz.

References

1959 births
Living people
Politicians from Veracruz
People from Xalapa
Party of the Democratic Revolution politicians
20th-century Mexican politicians
21st-century Mexican politicians
Universidad Veracruzana alumni
Members of the Congress of Veracruz
Deputies of the LXII Legislature of Mexico
Members of the Chamber of Deputies (Mexico) for Veracruz